His Master's Voice is a 1925 American silent war drama film directed by Renaud Hoffman and starring Thunder the Dog, George Hackathorne, Marjorie Daw and Mary Carr. It was designed as a vehicle for Thunder, an Alsatian who featured in several films during the 1920s.

Synopsis
Following America's entry into World War I, the cowardly Bob Henley is drafted into the army while his faithful dog Thunder joins the Red Cross. They meet again several months later in France where Thunder helps Bob to overcome his terror and fulfil his duty.

Cast
 Thunder the Dog as Thunder
 George Hackathorne as 	Bob Henley
 Marjorie Daw as Mary Blake
 Mary Carr as Mrs. Henley
 Will Walling as William Marshall
 Brooks Benedict as 	Jack Fenton
 White Fawn the Dog as 	White Fawn
 Flash the Dog as	Flash - Son of Thunder
 Jack Kenny as 	Soldier

References

Bibliography
 Connelly, Robert B. The Silents: Silent Feature Films, 1910-36, Volume 40, Issue 2. December Press, 1998.
 Munden, Kenneth White. The American Film Institute Catalog of Motion Pictures Produced in the United States, Part 1. University of California Press, 1997.

External links
 

1925 films
1925 drama films
1920s war drama films
1920s English-language films
American silent feature films
American war drama films
Films directed by Renaud Hoffman
American black-and-white films
Gotham Pictures films
American World War I films
Films set in France
1920s American films
Silent American drama films
Silent war drama films